Frederick Werner Preller (March 29, 1902 – August 29, 1974) was a New York State Assemblyman from 1944 until 1965.

Life
He was born on March 29, 1902, in Greenpoint, Brooklyn, New York City. He attended St. Nicholas Parochial School and St. Nicholas Commercial High School. From about 1930 on, he worked as a securities consultant for Eastman Dillon & Co., after a merger in 1956 known as Eastman Dillon, Union Securities & Co.

Preller was a member of the New York State Assembly from 1945 to 1965, sitting in the 165th, 166th, 167th, 168th,  169th, 170th, 171st, 172nd, 173rd, 174th and 175th New York State Legislatures; and was Chairman of the Committee on Ways and Means from 1961 to 1964.

He was an alternate delegate to the 1944 and 1964 Republican National Conventions. He was Chairman of the Queens County Republican Committee from September 1962 to January 1965.

In October 1964, Preller was questioned about his missing income tax returns from 1960 to 1962. In December 1965, he was accused of not filing income tax returns from 1959 to 1963. In 1969, he pleaded guilty to not having paid income tax in 1961.

He died on August 29, 1974, at his home at 218–05 100th Avenue in Queens Village, Queens.

Preller's grandson, James Preller, would go on to become an author.

Sources

1902 births
1974 deaths
People from Greenpoint, Brooklyn
Republican Party members of the New York State Assembly
People from Queens, New York
20th-century American politicians